The men's 200 metres event at the 1965 Summer Universiade was held at the People's Stadium in Budapest on 27 and 28 August 1965.

Medalists

Results

Heats
Held on 27 August

Wind:Heat 4: +1.9 m/s

Semifinals
Held on 28 August

Wind:Heat 2: 0.0 m/s

Final
Held on 28 August

Wind: +2.5 m/s

References

Athletics at the 1965 Summer Universiade
1965